Paolo Vittori (born 31 May 1938) is a retired Italian professional basketball player and coach. In 2006, he was inducted into the Italian Basketball Hall of Fame.

Professional career
Vittori was a member of the FIBA European Selection, in 1964.

National team career
Vittori was a part of the senior Italian national basketball teams that won a gold medal at the 1963 Mediterranean Games, and finished fourth, fifth, and eighth at the 1960 Summer Olympics, the 1964 Summer Olympics, and the 1968 Summer Olympics, respectively.

References

External links

FIBA Profile 1
FIBA Profile 2

1938 births
Living people
AMG Sebastiani Basket coaches
AMG Sebastiani Basket players
Basketball players at the 1960 Summer Olympics
Basketball players at the 1964 Summer Olympics
Basketball players at the 1968 Summer Olympics
Italian basketball coaches
Italian men's basketball players
1963 FIBA World Championship players
Olimpia Milano players
Olympic basketball players of Italy
Pallacanestro Varese coaches
Pallacanestro Varese players
Partenope Napoli Basket players
Small forwards
Mediterranean Games gold medalists for Italy
Mediterranean Games medalists in basketball
Competitors at the 1963 Mediterranean Games